KBOI (670 kHz) is a commercial AM radio station in the western United States, located in Boise, Idaho.   It is owned by Cumulus Media and airs a news/talk radio format. Studios and offices are on Bannock Street in Downtown Boise, while its transmitter is located at a six-tower array southwest of the city.

KBOI is Idaho's most powerful AM station, broadcasting with 50,000 watts around the clock. During the day, a single non-directional antenna beams the station's full power to Southwestern Idaho and Eastern Oregon. At night, power is fed to all six towers in a directional pattern to avoid interfering with WSCR in Chicago, the Class A clear-channel station on 670 AM. Even though it must direct its signal north-south as a result, KBOI can still be heard with across much of the western half of North America at night with a good radio, but is strongest in the Pacific Northwest.  Because of this, KBOI is Idaho's designated primary entry point station for the Emergency Alert System.  KBOI is licensed by the FCC to broadcast in the HD Radio hybrid digital format, although it currently does not have HD turned on.

Programming
Weekdays begin with an news and information show, "Kasper and Chris," featuring Mike Kasper and Chris Walton.  The KBOI morning newscaster is station news director Rick Worthington.  KBOI's afternoon drive time slot is hosted Nate Shelman, who also serves as the station's program director.

In middays and nights, the station features syndicated conservative talk shows, including Dan Bongino, Ben Shapiro, Mark Levin and Red Eye Radio from the co-owned Westwood One Network.  Most hours begin with world and national news from ABC News Radio.

Weekends on KBOI include shows on money, real estate, home improvement, law and gardening, as well as religious and paid brokered programming.  Syndicated shows include Bill Handel on the Law, Ben Ferguson and Bill Cunningham. The station broadcasts NFL football as an affiliate of the Seattle Seahawks' Radio Network.

History

KDSH
The call sign was originally KDSH, founded by Boise Valley Broadcasters, with its studios at 311 North 10th Street. Boise Valley Broadcasters was a subsidiary of the Church of Jesus Christ of Latter-day Saints.

KDSH was originally on 950 kHz, powered at 5,000 watts.  It was a CBS Radio Network affiliate, carrying its dramas, comedies, news, sports, soap operas, game shows and big band broadcasts during the "Golden Age of Radio."  In 1953, Boise Valley Broadcasters put a TV station on the air, Channel 2 KBOI.  It was Boise's second TV station after Channel 7 KIDO-TV.

KBOI
On February 11, 1955, the stations switched their call letters to KBOI and KBOI-TV; the change was made possible by the relocation of the television station's city of license from Meridian to Boise.  An FM radio station was added in 1960, 97.9 KBOI-FM (now KQFC).  As network programming moved from radio to television, KBOI-AM-FM switched to a full service, middle of the road (MOR) format of popular music, news and sports.  In the late 1960s, KBOI-FM broke away from the simulcast and began playing beautiful music.

In the 1980s, as listeners switched from AM to FM for music listening, KBOI added more talk programming.  It eventually completed the change over to all talk.

Cumulus Media

In 2005, its owner at the time, Citadel Broadcasting, switched KBOI's affiliation to ABC's Information Network, in advance of Citadel's 2007 acquisition of ABC Radio. Citadel merged with Cumulus Media on September 16, 2011.  At the beginning of 2015, Cumulus switched KBOI and most of its other news/talk stations from ABC News to Cumulus-owned Westwood One News.  In 2020, Westwood One News was discontinued and KBOI returned to ABC News affiliation.

KBOI was the contracted radio station for Boise State University Broncos football and men's basketball from 1973 through early 2008, with Paul J. Schneider as play-by-play announcer. The Broncos returned to KBOI during the 2010 season with Bob Behler serving as the Voice of the Broncos.

FM simulcast
On January 3, 2022, KBOI began simulcasting on KTIK-FM (93.1), which concurrently took on the KBOI-FM call sign. KTIK-FM had previously simulcast the sports format of sister station KTIK.

Morning show
The KBOI morning show, "Idaho's First Morning News/Idaho Talks Live" was anchored by Paul J. Schneider and Chris Walton until December 2018, when Schneider retired from full-time broadcasting after 51 years with KBOI-TV and KBOI Radio. Schneider, an Illinois native who moved to Idaho as a teen with his parents and brother, was a KBOI Radio morning host from 1976 to 2018.  Walton, a native of Twin Falls, joined the program in 2001, moving from the morning drive show at Citadel-owned classic rock station KKGL-FM.

Idaho native Mike Kasper, the former morning drive co-host of Boise station KCIX-FM, was hired by KBOI following Schneider's retirement.  Since January 2019, the KBOI wake up program has been known as "Kasper and Chris".

The radio morning show was simulcast on then-local Fox Television Network station KTRV-TV from 8am to 10am Monday through Friday from 2003 through 2010.  KTRV dropped the program after Boise CBS affiliate television station KBCI-TV changed its call letters back to KBOI-TV in 2010 (after spending the last 35 years as KBCI-TV) to reflect a renewed partnership with KBOI radio.

References

External links
FCC History Cards for KBOI

News and talk radio stations in the United States
BOI
Cumulus Media radio stations
Radio stations established in 1947
1947 establishments in Idaho